Mount Zion Church and Cemetery is a historic church and cemetery located east of Hallsville in Boone County, Missouri. The Gothic Revival style frame church was built in 1903. It was the location of the Battle of Mount Zion Church during the American Civil War. The cemetery contains over seven hundred grave sites, including many American Civil War soldiers. The grounds contain a memorial to the Missouri State Guard. The church is still functioning today.

It was listed on the National Register of Historic Places in 2013.

See also
 List of cemeteries in Boone County, Missouri

References

External links
 Mt. Zion Church website
 
 

Historic districts on the National Register of Historic Places in Missouri
Missouri in the American Civil War
Cemeteries on the National Register of Historic Places in Missouri
Churches on the National Register of Historic Places in Missouri
Gothic Revival church buildings in Missouri
Churches in Boone County, Missouri
National Register of Historic Places in Boone County, Missouri